Dick Benson may refer to:

Dick Benson (ice hockey), played for Pittsburgh Shamrocks
Dick Benson, a fictional character in S.O.B. (film)

See also
Richard Benson (disambiguation)